Halophila baillonis is a species of aquatic plant in the family Hydrocharitaceae. It is referred to by the common name clover grass. It is native to Brazil, Cayman Islands, Colombia, Costa Rica, Jamaica, Leeward Islands, Netherlands Antilles, Panama, Puerto Rico, Trinidad and Tobago, and Venezuela.  It is listed on the IUCN Red List as "vulnerable" due to its naturally rare occurrence and fragmented populations.

Description
This seagrass has fragile rhizomes with a single stem and a single root at each node. There may be as many as 2,500 shoots per square metre.

Distribution and habitat
Clover grass is native to the Caribbean area. It is known from several sites in the Greater Antilles, Colombia, Venezuela and Belize, but its distribution is very patchy. It was previously known from Guanacaste Province on the Pacific coast of Costa Rica, but has not been seen there since a severe storm in 1996 and is not known from elsewhere in the Pacific. In 2015 it was found on the coast of Brazil in the state of Paraíba on a sheltered bar at the mouth of the Mamanguape River.

Ecology
Where it is plentiful, as in Belize, it is sometimes found growing among the prop roots of mangroves, intermingled with Thalassia testudinum, Halophila decipiens, Halodule wrightii and Caulerpa spp.. It provides food for the West Indian manatee and concealment for young nurse sharks. The scorched mussel lives in the seagrass meadows and fish such as the flag-fin mojarra and the permit feed on the mussels and consume the seagrass while doing so.

Status
This is a rare species of sea grass with a very fragmented distribution. Its greatest abundance is in the Placencia Lagoon in Belize, where it grows in dense monospecific stands. In several places, such as in Colombia and Puerto Rico, its presence has been confirmed in the past but it has not been found recently. For these reasons, the International Union for Conservation of Nature has assessed its conservation status as being "vulnerable".

References

baillonis
Flora of the Caribbean
Taxa named by Paul Friedrich August Ascherson
Flora of Brazil
Flora of the Cayman Islands
Flora of Colombia
Flora of Costa Rica
Flora of the Dutch Caribbean
Flora of Jamaica
Flora of the Leeward Islands
Flora of the Netherlands Antilles
Flora of Panama
Flora of Puerto Rico
Flora of Trinidad and Tobago
Flora of Venezuela
Taxobox binomials not recognized by IUCN